The following highways are numbered 325:

Canada
Nova Scotia Route 325
 Quebec Route 325

China
 China National Highway 325

Costa Rica
 National Route 325

India
 National Highway 325 (India)

Japan
 Japan National Route 325

United States
  Arkansas Highway 325
  Colorado State Highway 325
  Florida State Road 325 (former)
  Georgia State Route 325
  Iowa Highway 325 (former)
  Louisiana Highway 325 (former)
  Kentucky Route 325
  Montana Secondary Highway 325
  New Mexico State Road 325
 New York:
  New York State Route 325
  County Route 325 (Erie County, New York)
  Ohio State Route 325
  Oklahoma State Highway 325
  Pennsylvania Route 325
  Puerto Rico Highway 325
  Tennessee State Route 325
 Texas:
  Texas State Highway 325 (former)
  Texas State Highway Spur 325
  Farm to Market Road 325
  Virginia State Route 325